The Frauen-Bundesliga (German for Women's Federal League), currently known as the FLYERALARM Frauen-Bundesliga for sponsorship reasons, is the top level of league competition for women's association football in Germany. 

In the UEFA Women's Champions League, the Frauen-Bundesliga is the most successful league with a total of nine titles from four clubs.

In 1990 the German Football Association (DFB) created the German Women's Bundesliga, based on the model of the men's Bundesliga. It was first played with north and south divisions, but in 1997 the groups were merged to form a uniform league. The league currently consists of twelve teams and the seasons usually last from late summer to the end of spring with a break in the winter. Despite the league's competitiveness, it has been semi-professional. VfL Wolfsburg has won the most championships.

Competition format
The Bundesliga consists of twelve teams. At the end of a season, the club in the top spot is the champion, gaining the title of Deutscher Meister, and the clubs finishing 11th and 12th are replaced with the respective top-placed teams of the two 2. Frauen-Bundesliga divisions. A Bundesliga season consists of two rounds, with 22 games combined. In a round every club plays against each other, having a home game against a specific club in one round and an away game in the other. The seasons typically start in August or September, with the first round finishing in December. The second round typically starts in February and ends in May or June, though sometimes the first games of the second round are held in December. In World Cup years, the league might alter its schedule to accommodate the tournament.

The Bundesliga ranking is determined by points a club has gained during a season. A win is worth 3 points, a draw 1, and a loss 0. The tiebreakers are in descending order goal difference, goals for, and head-to-head results. If the tie in the league table cannot be broken, a tie-breaking game is held.

Clubs

2022–23 season

Champions

Wins by club

International competitions
Each season's champion as well as the second-place finisher qualifies for the next season's UEFA Women's Champions League.

Starting with the 2021–22 edition, as determined by the UEFA women's coefficient, the top three teams will qualify for the UEFA Women's Champions League.

Broadcasting

2022/23 season

2023/24 season

See also

 List of German women's football champions
 DFB-Pokal (women)
 Women's sports
 List of foreign Frauen-Bundesliga players

References

External links

 
1W
Ger
Sports leagues established in 1990
1990 establishments in Germany